The 1992 Malaysian motorcycle Grand Prix was the third round of the 1992 Grand Prix motorcycle racing season. It took place on the weekend of 17–19 April 1992 at the Shah Alam Circuit.

500 cc race report
Kevin Schwantz injured his hand in practice and missed the race.
Mick Doohan was on pole and got the lead at the start from Àlex Crivillé and Wayne Rainey. Then Doohan got a small gap while Rainey moved into 2nd. Rain brought out a red flag; 18 laps for a second leg in intermediate conditions. After one or two laps, Doohan was again at the front, followed by Juan Garriga. The rain started pouring and there was another red flag, ending the race.

500 cc classification

References

Malaysian motorcycle Grand Prix
Malaysian
Motorcycle